Sir Thomas Richardson (28  December 1846 – 22 May 1906) was an English Liberal Unionist politician.

Richardson stood unsuccessfully for Parliament in The Hartlepools at the 1892 general election, losing by a narrow margin of 76 votes (less than 1% of the total) to the sitting Liberal Party member, Christopher Furness. He won the seat at the 1895 general election, with a majority of 81 votes, but at the next general election, in October 1900, Furness retook the seat with a large majority. Richardson did not stand again.

References

External links 
 

1846 births
1906 deaths
Liberal Unionist Party MPs for English constituencies
Members of the Parliament of the United Kingdom for English constituencies
UK MPs 1895–1900